Skeleton Antique is a slab serif wooden letterpress typeface designed by William Hamilton Page and first shown in his company's 1865 catalog. The face is nearly monoline in its stroke width and lacks the over-ornamentation typical of both Page's faces and of other nineteenth century letterpress types.

References 
Specimen Book and Price List of Printing Material. Palmer & Rey, San Francisco: 1892. 

Slab serif typefaces
Wood typefaces
Digital typefaces
1865 introductions